The Voice Chile is a Chilean reality talent show that premiered on Canal 13 in 2015. Based on the reality singing competition The Voice of Holland, the series was created by Dutch television producer John de Mol.

The show is renewed for third season under the new broadcaster, Chilevisión.

Format
The Voice Chile is part of The Voice franchise which is based on the Netherlands original entitled The Voice of Holland. The series consists of three phases: a blind audition, a battle phase, and live performance shows. Four coaches, all noteworthy recording artists, choose teams of contestants through a blind audition process. Each coach has the length of the auditioners performance to decide if he or she wants that singer on his or her team; if two or more judges want the same singer (as happens frequently), the singer has the final choice of coach.

Each team of singers is mentored and developed by its respective coach. In the second stage, called the battle phase, coaches have two of their team members battle against each other directly by singing the same song together, with the coach choosing which team member to advance from each of individual "battles" into the first live round. Within that first live round, the surviving four acts from each team again compete head-to-head, with public votes determining one of two acts from each team that will advance to the final eight, while the coach chooses which of the remaining three acts comprises the other performer remaining on the team.

In the final phase, the remaining contestants compete against each other in live broadcasts. The television audience and the coaches have equal say 50/50 in deciding who moves on to the final 4 phase. With one team member remaining for each coach, the (final 4) contestants compete against each other in the finale with the outcome decided solely by public vote. The winner receives a record deal with Universal Republic.

Coaches and hosts

Chilean singers Nicole and Álvaro López, were joined by Puerto Rican singer Luis Fonsi and Italian-born Franco Simone as coaches for season one with Sergio Lagos taking on the responsibilities of hosting with Jean Philippe Cretton, who served as the backstage and social networking correspondent. After the season finale, Franco Simone went on saying that the production went against him and his team members in favor of the other coaches, subsequently letting him being replaced by Spanish singer Ana Torroja in the second season, alongside returning coaches Nicole, Lopez and Fonsi. Lagos and Cretton also returned to their respective positions.

Coaches and hosts

Host

Coaches

Notes

Coaches' teams 
Final contestant first listed. Winners are in bold, other finalists in italic, and eliminated contestants in small font.
 Winning coach and contestant
 Runner-up coach and contestant
 3rd place coach and contestant
 4th place coach and contestant

Series overview

References

External links

2010s Chilean television series
2015 Chilean television series debuts
Chile
Canal 13 (Chilean TV channel) original programming